Ashrafabad (also Romanized as Ashrafābād) is a village in Nurabad Rural District, in the Central District of Delfan County, Lorestan Province, Iran. At the 2006 census, its population was 282, in 52 families.

References 

Towns and villages in Delfan County